was a village located in the north of Tomata District, Okayama Prefecture, Japan, sharing a border with Tottori Prefecture.

As of 2003, the village had an estimated population of 669 and a population density of 15.90 persons per km2. The total area was 42.07 km2.

On February 28, 2005, Aba, along with the town of Kamo (also from Tomata District), the town of Shōboku (from Katsuta District), and the town of Kume (from Kume District), was merged into the expanded city of Tsuyama and no longer exists as an independent municipality.

Most of Aba's area is forest and/or mountains, and its major industries are agriculture and forestry. It has been affected by rural depopulation, leaving it with the smallest population in the prefecture.

Geography

Adjoining municipalities
Okayama Prefecture
Kamo
Tottori Prefecture
Tottori
Chizu

Education
There are two schools in Aba:
 Aba Primary School
 Kamo Middle School (an integrated primary-middle school)

Transportation

Road
Prefectural roads:
Okayama Prefectural Route 117 (Gomasugaeri-Yodo)
Okayama Prefectural Route 118 (Kamo-Mochigase)

Notable places and events
 Nondaki Fall

References

External links 

 阿波村（現：津山市） 大高下ふるさと村【字幕付き】(in Japanese)

Dissolved municipalities of Okayama Prefecture
Tsuyama
Articles lacking sources from June 2009
All articles lacking sources